Padi, PADI or Pa Di may refer to:

 Padi, Chennai, India, a locality and neighbourhood in the city of Chennai
 Padi railway station
 Padi, Iran, a village
 Padi Boyd, American astrophysicist
 Padi Richo, Indian politician
 Padi (band), an Indonesian rock band
 Pa Di language, spoken in the China-Vietnam border region

PADI
 PADI1, peptidyl arginine deiminase
 Professional Association of Diving Instructors, a scuba organization
 PPPoE Active Discovery Initiation, establishment of a connection via Point-to-Point Protocol over Ethernet

See also
 Paddy (disambiguation)
 Paddi (disambiguation)